The Department of Civil Aviation, Myanmar (abbreviated DCA) is an agency of the government of Burma. It is subordinate to the Ministry of Transport.

Background history 
During the pre-independence period, the British Overseas Airways Corporation (BOAC) took responsibility for carrying out all of Myanmar's civil aviation functions and after independence it was considered not appropriate for the aeronautical communications functions under the management of BOAC and through the efforts of efficient young communication engineers, the International Aeradio Limited (IAL) was contacted and Myanmar's aeronautical communication functions were contracted to IAL and so the foundation for the future of Myanmar's civil aviation communication sector was laid.

With a view for the systematic development of international civil aviation, the Chicago Convention was signed at Chicago on 4 April 1947 and the International Civil Aviation Organization (ICAO) was formed. Myanmar became a member state of the ICAO on 8 August 1948.

Organisation structures 
The Department of Civil Aviation (DCA) is headed by the Director General (DG) and is a subordinate organisation under the Ministry of Transport (MOT), the Government of the Republic of the Union of Myanmar. The DCA organised as the following;
 Regulatory Body
 Airworthiness Division
 Flight Standards Division
 Air Navigation Safety Division
 Aerodrome Standards and Safety Division
 Aviation Security Division
 Service Providers
 Civil Aviation Training Institute
 Yangon International Airport
 Mandalay International Airport
 30 Aerodrome Operators
 Communication, navigation and surveillance Division
 Air Traffic Management Division
 Aeronautical Information Services Division
 Supporting Body
 Air Transport Division
 Administration and Planning Division

References

External links

 Department of Civil Aviation, Myanmar
 DCA Myanmar at Facebook
 Aviation Manual 2010
 Flight Information Region In Myanmar	

Burma
Government agencies of Myanmar
Civil aviation in Myanmar
Transport organisations based in Myanmar